Frederick Valk (10 June 1895 – 23 July 1956) was a German-born Jewish stage and screen actor of Czech Jewish descent who fled to the United Kingdom in the late 1930s to escape Nazi persecution, and subsequently became a naturalised British citizen.

Despite making his later career in the English-speaking world, Valk never attempted to shed his heavy accent in either his stage or film work, and it became a trademark, particularly in film where he was often the first choice for a role which called for a German or generic Central European accent.

Stage career
Valk made his first appearance on the London stage in 1939, going on to play in numerous productions of classic drama including leading roles in Shakespeare, with his performances as Shylock in The Merchant of Venice and in the title role of Othello, attracting critical admiration. In 1946 he won the Ellen Terry Award for best actor for his performance in Fyodor Dostoyevsky's The Brothers Karamazov.

Valk also toured overseas, in the 1950s performing at the fledgling Stratford Shakespeare Festival in Canada. When challenged by local journalists that as a Jew he should feel uneasy about playing Shylock, he replied that the assertion made no more sense than saying a Scotsman should baulk at playing Macbeth, that he in fact found a strong pro-Semitic message in the play and that he deplored "that people are beset with prejudices of all sorts and can't bring themselves to wipe their eyes and read and think".

Critics responded with fulsome praise for his performance: "Mr Valk works in the grandest continental manner...every gesture breathes intelligence and every vocal note is true".

The Canadian Jewish Congress however, which had protested vociferously over the inclusion of the play in the Stratford programme, loathed the production, stating: "We were assured...in advance of the staging of the play that it would not emerge an anti-Semitic production, that Frederick Valk would rise to great heights as Shylock. These predictions did not materialize: the play remains the vilest anti-Semitic production on record."

Film career
Valk never received top-billing in films, but was happy to accept supporting roles in good screen productions. High-profile films in which he featured include The Young Mr. Pitt and Thunder Rock (both 1942); Dead of Night (1945); A Matter of Life and Death (1946); Mrs. Fitzherbert (1947); The Magic Box (1951); and The Colditz Story (1955).

Death
Aged 61, Valk died suddenly in London on 23 July 1956 during the run of the play Romanoff and Juliet in which he was appearing. His wife Diana subsequently wrote a memoir entitled Shylock for a Summer in which she revealed that Valk had been planning to write an autobiography at the time of his death, and had written a note to himself stating: "I don't want to talk at length of my histrionic adventures – the idea of this is to draw a curve of a life, lived in shadow and sun but lived with gratefulness."

Partial filmography

1927: Out of the Mist
1939: Traitor Spy – German Ambassador (uncredited)
1940: Night Train to Munich – Gestapo Officer 
1940: Neutral Port – Captain Traumer
1941: Gasbags – Sturmfuehrer
1941: This Man Is Dangerous – Dr. Moger
1941: Dangerous Moonlight – Polish Bomber Commander
1942: The Young Mr. Pitt – Minor Role (uncredited)
1942: Thunder Rock – Dr. Stefan Kurtz
1944: Hotel Reserve – Emil Schimler, alias Paul Heimberger
1945: Dead of Night – Dr. Van Straaten
1945: Latin Quarter – Dr. Ivan Krasner
1946: A Matter of Life and Death – RAF Chaplain (uncredited)
1947: Mrs. Fitzherbert – King George III
1948: Saraband for Dead Lovers – The Elector Ernest Augustus
1949: Dear Mr. Prohack – Dr. Viega
1951: Outcast of the Islands – Hudig
1951: The Magic Box – Maurice Guttenburg
1952: Top Secret – Rakov
1953: I Chose Love 
1953: Never Let Me Go – Kuragin
1953: The Flanagan Boy – Giuseppe Vecchi 
1953: Albert R.N. – Camp Kommandant
1955: The Colditz Story – Kommandant
1955: Magic Fire – Minister von Moll
1955: I Am a Camera – Doctor
1955: Secret Venture – Otto Weber
1956: Wicked as They Come – Mr. Reisner (uncredited)
1956: Zarak'' – Haji Khan (Zarak's father) (final film role)

References

External links
 

1895 births
1956 deaths
20th-century German male actors
British people of Czech-Jewish descent
German male film actors
German male stage actors
German male television actors
German people of Czech-Jewish descent
Jewish emigrants from Nazi Germany to the United Kingdom
Male actors from Hamburg
Naturalised citizens of the United Kingdom